Escape from Scorpion Island is a Bafta nominated BBC children's TV adventure game show in which contestants compete to 'escape from an exotic island'. Series 2 was produced by Foundation/Freehand for CBBC and the Australian Broadcasting Corporation.

Series two premiered on 28 September 2008 on BBC Two and on 3 November 2008 on ABC1. The series will often repeat on ABC3 along with series three.

This series are hosted by JK and Joel. Series two was filmed at Mission Beach, Queensland,  Australia in 2008. All episodes in this series were one hour in the UK and where shown on Sundays at 9am on BBC Two and on weekdays in Australia at 4:30pm on ABC1.
Series 2 also aired on YTV Canada in 2010.

Synopsis
Six adventurers arrived on Scorpion Island and were split into two teams, Sting and Claw. Hidden in the deep part of the island was a secret camp called Limbo, where 10 captives are held. The teams would battle it out to rescue team members from Limbo.

Contestants 
There were 16 adventurers on the island, 12 from the UK and 4 from Australia. The Australian adventurers were Alex Y, Ayla, Lachlan and Tara.

Original Teams:

Claw
Samantha "Sammy" Oakes, 13
Tara Pratarelli, 12
Jacob "Jake" Hankins, 13

Sting
Olivia Hunter, 14
Alexander "Alex" Yallouris, 13
Cameron Frazer, 12

Limbo Captives:
Anna Harris, 12
Amie Fletcher, 14
Elizabeth "Lizzy" Dayo, 12
Ayla Monreal, 13
Olivia "Livvy" Singleton, 13
Lachlan Townsend, 11
Alexander "Alex" Tomlinson, 12
Jack Matthews, 13
Oliver Norman, 13
Cai England, 12

Final Teams:

Team Claw (Black Helmets) 6 Members. Camp: Tree Camp.

 Jake (Original member.)
 Sammy (Original member and Power Player.) (Power Play: Head Start)
 Tara (Original member.)
 Ayla (Won by Claw in Decks of Doom.) (Second to escape Limbo and Power Player.) (Power Play: Swap)
 Alex T (Won by Claw in Rollin' Thunder.) (Last to escape Limbo and Power Player.) (Power Play: Freeze)
 Livvy (Won by Claw in Rollin' Thunder.) (Last to escape Limbo and former Power Player.) (Power Play: Head Start. Given to Sammy because she was injured and unable to compete but has control over it.)

Team Sting (Orange Helmets) 10 Members. Camp: Boat Camp.

 Olivia (Original member.)
 Alex Y (Original member.) (Sacrificed himself to Limbo after losing The Last Gasp.) (Won back by Sting in Reckless Rally.) (Eighth to escape Limbo.)
 Cameron (Original member.)
 Anna  (Won by Sting in One False Move. First to escape Limbo.)
 Lachlan (Won by Sting in Fearfall.) (Third to escape Limbo and Power Player.) (Power Play: False Start.)
 Cai (Won by Sting in Above and Beyond.) (Fourth to escape Limbo.)
 Jack (Won by Sting in Over the Edge.) (Ninth to escape Limbo.)
 Oliver (Originally a member of Claw won in The Last Gasp and became sixth to escape Limbo.) (Sacrificed himself to Limbo after losing Reckless Rally) (Was later won by Sting in Tower of Strength.) (Tenth to escape Limbo.)
 Amie (Originally a member of Claw won in Stretched to the Limit and became seventh to escape Limbo.) (Sent back to Limbo after losing Tower of Strength) (Was later won by Sting in Rollin' Thunder.) (Last to escape Limbo.)
 Lizzy (Originally a member of Claw won in Pedal of Peril and became fifth to escape Limbo.) (Sent back to Limbo after losing Tower of Strength.) (Was later won by Sting in Rollin' Thunder. Last to escape Limbo.)

Gaming Elements
 Limbo Challenge - The Limbo captives take part in this challenge in teams of blue and white. The captives in the winning team get the chance to be chosen by Sting or Claw to be in their teams. If there is a 1 vs 1 battle, the captive that wins is guaranteed of being in one of the teams.
 Ultimate Jeopardy - Sting and Claw take part in this challenge against each other with an added element to make it more hard. The winning teams gets their captive they have chosen, and the losing team's captive goes back to camp with nothing. The team that won the previous Ultimate Jeopardy chooses first and goes first in the challenge.
 Survival Challenge - The Limbo captives must do a task such as shooting darts or fishing. If they lose their challenge, they get a Forfeit such as no cutlery to eat their food with or being linked in pairs for the rest of the day. If they pass, then everything continues as normal for Limbo.
 Island Fire - The Island Fire selects the captain's for Sting and Claw, and also reveals the name of the next challenge.
 Stone of Selection - The Stone of Selection selects which Limbo captives will be playing the next Limbo Challenge. And on the first day it marked some limbo captives red indicating they are a Power Player.

Power Plays
The Power Plays are special advantages that are held by Limbo captives. They may only use their power play when they are on Sting or Claw. The captives are supposed to keep their power play a secret, but if they reveal their secret to someone in Claw or Sting before they're released from Limbo, their power play is passed on to someone else.

 Swap - Allows the player to swap a member on the opposing team who is playing a challenge for someone else who isn't participating. Held by Ayla and used in Stretched to the Limit to swap Anna with Olivia.
 False Start - Allows the player to stop the challenge they are currently playing and start again. It can only be used within the first 60 seconds of the challenge. Held by Lachlan and used in Reckless Rally to restart the round after the buggy got stuck.
 Head Start - Allows the player to start a challenge before their rival team. Originally held by Livvi but given to Sammy because of her leg injury and used in The Crush Rush to start 6 seconds before the boulder.
 Freeze - Allows the player to stop their rival team continuing for twenty seconds. Held by Alex T and used in Vertigo to stop Sting for twenty seconds, but unfortunately his team lost that round.

List of Challenges 
Note: Episode count are based in Australian airing (in which 2 half hour episodes are show for each day on the island). UK airs 1 hour episodes for each day.

Day 1 (Episodes 1 and 2) 
 Sky High Scramble - The teams would have to climb up a series of logs and reach their team flag and make their way down. However, the steps get bigger the higher they go up. The first team to get their teams flag and reach the ground wins
 Challenge - Olivia, Alex and Cameron from Sting vs Sammy, Jake and Tara from Claw.
 Reward: - The first choice of camps: Tree Camp or Boat Camp.

On the first day at Scorpion Island, all six of the original members skydived on Scorpion Island from a height of 4000 metres ready to take part in the challenges that the island has waiting. Meanwhile, ten captives were locked up in a crate hanging from a helicopter and landed on the island as well and they are in a hidden camp in the forest called Limbo which Sting and Claw don’t know about yet

In the first challenge, Sting were leading earlier, but one of the logs broke just as they got their team flag and ended up hanging on another log. Claw later had the lead, but not only did one of the stepping logs broke, Tara dropped their team flag just as she was about to put it in her pocket. It was neck and neck as they both descended the challenge. Claw got to the ground first, but had to go to Sting's side to reclaim their flag, but it was too late and Sting won the challenge. Sting chose Boat Camp, leaving Claw with Tree Camp.

At the Stone of Selection, the Limbo captives were selected one at a time to see if they would be playing the next challenge. Four Limbo captives (Ayla, Lachlan, Alex T. and Livvi) were not selected and were told that they were secret Power Players.

Day 2 (Episodes 3 and 4) 
 One False Move - Teams have to grab bamboo poles from a set of poles hanging over the rapid river while trying not to get the other poles from falling. One point for every pole removed by a team. One point lost for every pole that falls into the river. In Ultimate Jeopardy, the player who had to remove the bamboo poles also had their hands tied together.
 Limbo Challenge - Anna, Cai and Lizzie for Blue Team vs. Ollie, Amy and Jack for White Team.
 Ultimate Jeopardy - Olivia, Alex and Cameron from Sting vs Sammy, Jake and Tara from Claw.
 Reward -  The chance for Anna to join Sting and Cai to join Claw 
 Survival Challenge - The captives had to send and receive a message in morse code and decipher it correctly.
 Forfeit - If the code is deciphered incorrectly, no talking in Limbo for the rest of the evening.

In the Limbo Challenge, Ollie went first and only dropped one pole but grabbed another. Anna went next and easily grabbed a pole. When it came to Ollie again, he dropped 22 other poles and lost the challenge for his team since it was impossible for the white team to catch up. As a result, the blue team won the challenge and the white team returned to Limbo.

In the Ultimate Jeopardy, Team Sting dropped a few poles early on, and just as Team Claw was about to win it with their last pole, Sammy dropped five. That mistake cost them victory and Team Sting won Anna.

In the Survival Challenge, despite Alex T struggling with the code and Lachlan and Ollie fighting for leadership, the captives passed the challenge.

Day 3 (Episodes 5 and 6) 
 Decks Of Doom - Two players from each team had to make their way on cables from one end to the other using only three skateboard decks in mid-air. Once they arrive to their destination, they grab the skull to win. If they lose all three decks, they must go back to the start. In Ultimate Jeopardy, one of the players had to be blindfolded while holding a rope with a skull. They must replace a skull at the end for the skull they are holding to win.
 Limbo Challenge - Alex T and Amy for White Team vs. Ayla and Jack for Blue Team.
 Ultimate Jeopardy - Cameron and Anna from Sting vs Sammy and Jake from Claw.
 Reward -  Jack if Sting win or Ayla if Claw win.
 Survival Challenge - The captives had to catch fish in the river for their evening meal with the fishing equipment.
 Forfeit - If no one caught a fish, there would be basic rations in camp.

In the Limbo Challenge, Alex T kept falling and felt frustrated, while Jack and Ayla worked together to get to the end. Even Jack cheered for Alex T showing how valuable he is as a player. In the end, the Blue Team won and the White Team returned to Limbo. Sting wanted Jack, leaving Claw fighting for Ayla, despite they wanted Jack as well because he was a strong male player for Jake.

In Ultimate Jeopardy, Cameron gave a valiant effort while Anna was blindfolded. As for Jake and Sammy, despite they fell once, they took a lot of time making progress. Even though Team Sting was much faster, they kept falling off. In the end, Claw won and not only did they gain Ayla, they also had the Power Play, 'Swap', which was a great advantage for Claw, for if they had chosen Jack, they wouldn't have received a Power Play.

In the Survival Challenge, eventually, Lizzy caught a tiny fish in the river and they did not receive the forfeit. Alex T fell in backwards and got soaked.

Day 4 (Episodes 7 and 8) 
 Fearfall - One player has to ascend and descend on Skeleton Falls while removing coconuts from little bags strung down the waterfall. To help them up, another player will be pulling ropes to ascend and descend that player while another player will be giving directions. The team that releases all their coconuts and gets to the top first wins. In Ultimate Jeopardy, the climber of the waterfall had to get one coconut at a time and were being hauled up high to place it up on top of a crate. The first team to put all eight coconuts on the crate and release their team coloured balls wins.
 Limbo Challenge - Cai, Lachlan and Lizzie for Blue Team vs. Livvi, Ollie and Jack for White Team.
 Ultimate Jeopardy - Olivia, Alex and Cameron from Sting vs Tara, Sammy and Ayla from Claw.
 Reward - Lachlan if Sting win or Cai if Claw win.
 Survival Challenge - The Limbo captives had to play 'Chinese Whispers', but before passing the message on to the next person, each captive had to fulfill a certain task such as spelling their name backwards, name all their members in Limbo, run around the group twice, peel and eat a banana and do ten star jumps.
 Forfeit - If the message is finished incorrectly, the captives were being tethered together in pairs for the rest of the day.

In the Limbo Challenge, Ollie struggled again and in the end, Cai, Lachlan and Lizzie won.

In Ultimate Jeopardy, Jake wasn't happy for not being selected to take part in the challenge saying that girls alone won't win this challenge. Ayla was climbing and being pulled by Tara while Sammy was the spotter. As a result, Jake was right. Ayla was a good climber being as strong as Olivia, but halfway through she started losing it which gave Olivia a chance to catch up and go ahead. Claw worked very well together but due to some gear and the steep slant on their side of the waterfall, they had some trouble and lost. Sting, with Olivia, Cameron and Alex playing won, and gained Lachlan, including a Power Play, "False Start".

During the survival challenge, the message changed when Amie was distracted by her task, which made everyone else change it more, and the group was tied together in pairs. The pairs were as follows:
 Alex T and Cai
 Amy and Jack
 Lachlan and Ollie
 Livvi and Lizzie

However, the group made the situation good by getting to know each other, especially Lachlan and Ollie after leadership complaints during their first survival challenge. The group also did things like tying shoelaces, playing limbo and going around a pole.

Day 5 (Episode 9 and 10) 
 Above and Beyond - Teams have to try and match sixteen coloured scorpions. One puzzle board from above and the other board from below. The winning team is the one who makes the most matches before a leaky barrel that is holding the person up runs out of water. In case of a tie, the team who matches the fastest wins. In Ultimate Jeopardy, the scorpions on the high puzzle board are replaced with slimey eggs.
 Limbo Challenge - Amy, Lizzie, Ollie for Blue Team vs. Alex T, Cai, Livvi for White Team.
 Ultimate Jeopardy - Olivia, Anna and Lachlan from Sting vs Ayla, Sammy and Jake from Claw.
 Reward - Cai if Sting win or Livvi if Claw win.
 Survival Challenge - The Limbo captives had to build a bridge over the river, have one person cross it without touching the water, collect a flaming torch, and bring it back.
 Forfeit - If the person crossing touches the water, there would be no electricity or power in Limbo for the night.

During the Stone of Selection, Livvi believed that whoever was in the white team would lose because in all the Limbo Challenges, the white team had lost. Also, this was the first time Jack wasn't selected to take part in the Limbo Challenge.

In the Limbo Challenge, despite Ollie had a better performance compared to his previous Limbo Challenges, the Blue team's time of 2:44 wasn't quick enough to beat the White Team's time of 2:29.

In Ultimate Jeopardy, Sting made 13 matches and Claw made 10. As a result, Sting won and gained Cai.

In the Survival Challenge, despite a few arguments, the Limbo captives completed the challenge with Livvi safely returning the torch and avoided the forfeit.

Day 6 (Episode 11 and 12) 
 Pedal of Peril - One by one, each player had to ride a push bike over a very wobbly bridge. If no one completes it, the player who covers the most distance wins it for their team. In Ultimate Jeopardy, the teams had to ride on petrol powered scooters.
 Limbo Challenge - Amy, Alex T and Lizzie for Blue Team vs. Jack, Livvi and Ollie for White Team.
 Ultimate Jeopardy -  Cameron and Anna from Sting vs Tara and Jake from Claw.
 Reward - Amy if Sting win or Lizzie if Claw win.
 Survival Challenge - One person had to hide behind a fence and describe every player's belongings on the table without saying what it was or who it belonged to. The rest of the group had to identify what it was and who it belonged to.
 Forfeit - If any objects are no identified, the island would confiscate them.

In the Limbo Challenge, no one crossed the bridge completely but Amie of the blue team covered the most distance by a whisker over Jack of the white team.

Before Ultimate Jeopardy, Anna, who was the captain of Sting, selected Amie. Jake, who was the captain of Claw selected Lizzy as he believed she has done well through the past Limbo Challenges. Jake wanted another guy for their team, but didn't choose Alex T and also missed out on the Freeze Power Play.

In Ultimate Jeopardy, Cameron went first in his run while Anna was cheering for him, but Tara covered her mouth to stop her cheering. Cameron reached around halfway through the bridge. Tara went second and she too reached the halfway mark despite getting the accelerator and brake mixed up. Anna went third, she had an amazing sense for balance but she thought that extending her leg would help her turn the scooter but didn't know that she had to use the handles to turn it. As soon as she fell, Lizzie was hugging Jake from her cage believing she'll be freed from Limbo. Jake went last, he used Cameron's original idea of going very fast to avoid wobbling. He fell only few inches before the end and covered the most distance of the all. In the end, Jake and Tara covered the most distance than Cameron and Anna and won the challenge. As a result, Claw gained Lizzie. At the special River Camp, Lizzie overcame her fear of deep water.

In the Survival Challenge, Amy described all the objects and each one was identified by the other captives.

Day 7 (Episode 13 and 14) 
 The Last Gasp - Each player had to get a skull out of a net and throw it on top of a pontoon. After six skulls, they must return to the start, grab a skull from underwater and place it on a floating holder. The team who swims the course the quickest time wins. In Ultimate Jeopardy, the players had a skull tied on the rope through the holes in the pontoons. The player must then dive down, open the chest on the bottom of the river to free the team skull and carry it back to the start and put it on the floating holder.
 Limbo Challenge - Alex T for Blue Team vs. Ollie for White Team.
 Ultimate Jeopardy - Alex Y from Sting vs Jake from Claw.
 Reward - Ollie for the winning team and the participating player from the losing team will go to Limbo.
 Survival Challenge - Each captive had two shots to use a blowdart and hit one different sized item each. They must hit 4 out of 5 items to avoid the forfeit.
 Forfeit - If the captives hit less than four items, all of them would have to eat in the dark.

At the Island Fire in the previous night, the teams found out that the team that will lose the next Ultimate Jeopardy would have to sacrifice their participating player to Limbo. Tara who was the team captain of Claw chose Jake to play and Sting's captain Alex Y of Sting chose himself. When they left, Sting thought Alex Y was brave to be offered as their sacrifice, especially Anna who thought she was the weakest link after losing both of her challenges since joining the team. Tara on the other hand felt really bad for choosing anyone in the team and losing them. She was deciding on either Jake or Lizzie to take part in the challenge, but the rest of the team believed that Jake will win the Ultimate Jeopardy and gain a new member for their team.

After Claw won their last challenge and Lizzy, Sting decided to trash Claw's Tree Camp by doing things like turning their furniture upside down and taking bites out of their fruit. When Claw came back, they were not happy that Sting did it to their camp and believed that they were sore losers, since they won four of the six challenges so far. Claw decided to confront Sting about this. Sting denied that they trashed their camp. Claw knew that it was them because Lachlan left a toy snake at their camp. They said that they will get their revenge by winning the next challenge.

In the Survival Challenge, each Limbo captives had to select a target (between an egg, a grapefruit, a melon, a pineapple and a watermelon) and had only two shots to make the target. They all got a practice shot at the melon because it was medium-sized. Livvi went for the egg because she hit the melon in the centre, Jack went for the grapefruit, Amie went for the melon, Ollie went for the pineapple and Alex T went for the watermelon for completely missing the melon. Alex T hit the watermelon in his first shot, Ollie missed the pineapple in both attempts, Amy just hit the bottom of the melon in her second attempt and Jack just missed the grapefruit, so Livvi didn't need to go for the egg because the group failed the challenge. As a result, they all had to eat in the dark. Despite having to do the forfeit, the Limbo captives made a bad situation fun by having a food fight in the dark.

In the Limbo Challenge, Ollie completed the course in 2:19 and Alex T, despite not having too much confidence in water, his time of 2:36 was not enough to win the Limbo Challenge. Therefore, Ollie was the prize for the winning team in Ultimate Jeopardy.

In Ultimate Jeopardy both of the players had problems with the challenge. Jake went first and thought it would be faster if he tried to pull the rope from the last hole. The tactic badly misfired and the skull got stuck 3 times losing Jake around 20 seconds to free it. Alex freed the skull from the first pontoon but he lost it, he went back to find it not knowing and seeing that the skull was tied to a rope and that Jake went to next pontoon and pulled it from there. He also made it harder for himself because he had to carry the skull. In the end, Jake's time of 4:11 was better than Alex Y's time of 4:22, meaning Jake won the challenge for Team Claw. As a result, Claw gained Ollie and Sting's Alex had to go to Limbo. If Sting won Ultimate Jeopardy instead, Claw would be down to four members while Sting would have seven members. Instead, Claw now lead with six members to Sting's five members.

Day 8 (Episode 15 and 16) 
 Stretched to the Limit - The teams have to grab 9 giant puzzle pieces from the beach while being attached to a bungie cord, and get the pieces to the puzzle board in the middle of the sea on a pontoon. The Team that solves the puzzle in the quickest time wins. In Ultimate Jeopardy, the teams are attached to the same bungie cord similar to tug of war, and the puzzle board is on the beach along with the pieces. The team that solves the puzzle first wins.
 Limbo Challenge - Amy and Jack for Blue Team vs. Alex T and Livvi for White Team.
 Ultimate Jeopardy - Lachlan, Cameron and Anna from Sting vs Ayla, Sammy, Lizzy from Claw.
 Reward - Jack if Sting win or Amy if Claw win.
 Survival Challenge - The captives had to put the correct weights on three different sets of scales to balance them.
 Forfeit - If the scales are not balanced, all captives would be tethered to the ground in Limbo.

After Sting's Alex lost the last challenge and went to Limbo, the captives made a welcoming to him by putting face paints on each other representing Limbo. The Stone of Selection didn't select Alex for the next challenge, but he was alright about and decided to use it for a rest day.

In the Limbo Challenge, Jack and Amy had a good start, although Jack had a much difficult time getting the puzzle pieces compared to Amy. In addition, the pair didn't got along well by not talking to each other. Eventually, they managed to get all the pieces to the puzzle board and quickly completed the puzzle thanks to Amy taking control of solving the puzzle. As for Alex T and Livvi, despite the both of them having a tough time getting the puzzle pieces, both of them worked well together by talking to each other and even held hands, showing great teamwork, but Livvi fell a couple of times. Unfortunately, their great teamwork was not enough to win the challenge because they were slower to complete the puzzle.

Before the Ultimate Jeopardy, Claw's captain Ayla decided to use her power play, "Swap". Originally, Sting's captain Lachlan selected Cameron and Olivia to take part with him in Ultimate Jeopardy. After Ayla discussed with her team members, Ayla decided to swap Olivia for Anna.

In Ultimate Jeopardy, Lizzie from Claw took a huge lead getting the pieces first and started placing them, while Sting struggled getting their pieces. Later, Cameron gained some composure by throwing the pieces to their puzzle board and pulled Claw away from their puzzle board, making Lizzie struggle to get a footing. Unfortunately, with Lizzy who had only one piece to put into place and Cameron taking way too long to complete the puzzle, Lizzie managed to slam the final piece into its position to claim victory for Claw. As a result, for winning the Ultimate Jeopardy, Claw gained Amy. Ayla took a big step in leading here as she cheered a lot for her team. When Lizzy was regaining her strength lying on the sand, Sammy and Ayla had to keep their footing. If they hadn't pulled their weight, Claw would have flung back against Sting.

In the Survival Challenge, all the scales were just balanced and the group did not receive the forfeit.

Day 9 (Episode 17 and 18) 
 Reckless Rally - The teams must drive a buggy around a twisty terrain course to knock their team skull off a boulder. If they knock a skull off a post, they get a 10-second time penalty. The Team that drives around the course in the fastest time wins. In Ultimate Jeopardy, the driver is blindfolded and a passenger has to give out directions.
 Limbo Challenge - Jack for Blue Team vs. Alex Y for White Team.
 Ultimate Jeopardy - Cai and Lachlan from Sting vs Oliver and Jake from Claw.
 Reward - Alex Y for the winning team and a participating player from the losing team will go to Limbo.
 Survival Challenge - The Limbo captives must put on blindfolds and nose pegs and correctly identify a series of foods by taste.
 Forfeit - If the food is guess incorrectly, the captives would have to eat with chopsticks for their evening meal.

On the previous night at the Island Fire, the teams found that the Limbo Challenge will be another 1 on 1. The Winning Team will get the Winner of the Limbo Challenge and the losing team will have to sacrifice either their team captain or the player they had chosen to take part in the challenge to Limbo.

In the Limbo Challenge, Jack carefully drove around the course and only got one time penalty, but Alex, who had experience, drove around much quicker and won the challenge. He even almost broke the buggy's engine.

In Ultimate Jeopardy, Jake was driving blindfolded with Ollie guiding him for Claw. Ollie easily managed to guide Jake, really focused and with Jake being really calm, with a minor number of mistakes and only knocking off one skull.

At the Island Fire the previous night, Cai, who was the captain for Sting, chose Lachlan to compete with him because he had a Power Play, False Start, which he decided to use. During Sting's run, Cai ended up getting stuck on the course so they both used the Power Play, False Start. In Sting's second run, Cai went so fast, Lachlan was shouting directions, Olivia and Anna were really nervous yelling to them to slow down, while Alex Y. was shouting directions and things like What are you doing?, Stop! They knocked down five skulls, which made team Claw happy thinking that there is no way they could lose.

Overall, Sting knocked down five skulls giving them a 50-second time penalty to Claw's one, giving them a 10-second penalty. Despite Sting's 50 second time penalty, they finished the course in 4 minutes and 15 seconds while Claw finished it in 4 minutes and 18 seconds. Therefore, Sting managed to gain Alex Y back. This also meant that Ollie had to decide whether Jake or himself would be going back to Limbo. Ollie didn't want to send Jake, an original member, so he decided to send himself to Limbo.

In the Survival Challenge, all the captives managed to identify the foods which were onion, lemon and garlic. They didn't like the taste of them and all spat them out. Jack ate the lemon, Alex Y ate the onion and Alex T ate all three with Jack telling him that he is weird.

Day 10 (Episode 19 and 20) 
 Over the Edge - The Teams must run and jump off a platform at the top of Skeleton Falls with a baseball bat to hit skulls being held up by the other player in six jumps. The Team that hits the most skulls wins. In Ultimate Jeopardy, one player must hold up another player which will be throwing skulls to the other player for them to hit in eight jumps.
 Limbo Challenge - Alex T and Jack for Blue Team vs. Livvi and Ollie for White Team.
 Ultimate Jeopardy - Olivia, Alex Y and Lachlan from Sting vs Lizzie, Amy and Sammy from Claw.
 Reward - Jack if Sting win or Alex T if Claw win.
 Survival Challenge - The Limbo captives must transfer enough water using buckets to a large container to remove a weight in five minutes.
 Forfeit - If the container isn't filled after five minutes, all Limbo captives have to eat without any cutlery.

Ollie went back to Limbo after his team lost against Sting. The other captives asked him questions about what Claw was like.

After Claw lost Ollie, Tara wanted revenge on Sting for making nasty comments, saying "In your face" towards them. All the members of Claw went to Sting's camp, unattended and trashed their Boat Camp and left. They Wound up the hammocks, took the furniture out of the camp and Put the table near a log upside down. When Sting returned, they thought it was silly that Claw did the same things Sting did to their camp. They also didn't think it was appropriate.

In the Limbo Challenge, Ollie wasn't close enough to hit the skulls in his first two runs, which made him frustrated. He managed to hit two skulls later on but then, he still couldn't get closer to hitting them. On Jack's turn, he wasn't close enough to the skulls, but managed to hit two skulls on his next run. Later, he managed to hit two more skulls making a total of four. On his last run though, he accidentally hit prolapsed skulls he already had hit, but Jack and Alex T were the winners.

In the Survival Challenge, Jack and Ollie ran with the buckets while Alex T handed them to Livvi who poured the water in the container. They took 4 minutes and 54 seconds to complete the challenge so they avoided the forfeit.

In Ultimate Jeopardy, Olivia held up Lachlan to throw skulls to Alex Y for Sting, and Lizzy held up Sammy to throw skulls to Amie for Claw. During Claw's turn, Amie missed the first two skulls but then hit another on her third go. Later, the team had worked on a pattern for throwing which made a total of five skulls. In Sting's turn, Alex Y first hit a skull on his second go. On his third go, he jumped too hard and accidentally spined through the air, but he managed to hit another skull directly above Lachlan. Sting's total was six skulls, making them the winner and they gained Jack.

Day 11 (Episode 21 and 22) 
 Tower of Strength - The Teams must use milk crates to build a tower all the way to the golden skull at the top. If the tower falls apart, the team will have to start over again. The first team to grab the skull wins. In Ultimate Jeopardy, single stacks of crates can only be built and one member must give the milk crates to their partner.
 Limbo Challenge - Alex T for Blue Team vs. Ollie for White Team.
 Ultimate Jeopardy - Cameron and Jack from Sting vs Lizzie and Amy from Claw.
 Reward - Ollie for the winning team.
 Survival Challenge: - The captives had to eat live ants.
 Forfeit - If any captives refuse to eat the ants, all of their food would be delivered in blocks of ice.

After Jack had left Limbo and there were only three captives left, Livvi felt that since Jack had gone, she thought the reasons that she and Alex T had always been in Limbo were because all of the better captives had already been picked. This is not true however, as she and Alex T have been commented by Sting and Claw saying that they had done well in challenges and sometimes had been chosen by them to go on their teams.

At the Stone of Selection, Livvi was originally stung to play the next challenge against Ollie, but her leg injury had not made her feel well enough that she was forced to not do the challenge and Alex T was chosen instead.

In the Limbo Challenge, Ollie built his tower slowly and carefully so it wouldn't fall over, while Alex T was rushing too much, causing some of the crates to not be locked and making him fall. Ollie had stacked 19 crates into two towers to stand on, but as he was going to put his last one, the tower fell. Alex had slightly got into the lead but, some of the crates did not lock in and he fell, but Ollie soon managed to make another one. As Ollie decided to jump for the skull he missed and his tower fell over again. Alex T started to get higher with his tower, and he kept psyching Ollie out. Ollie then managed to make his tower again and decided to reach out to the gold skull. Alex T, despite being lower than Ollie, decided to jump for it as well as Ollie was closer. Alex T. jumped first and missed, then Ollie jumped and caught the skull, which meant that he was escaping from Limbo again, though Claw would need to win Ultimate Jeopardy to win him back.

In Ultimate Jeopardy, Amy built her towers carefully, but when it came jumping off them, she would always misjudge her jump. Sting's Cameron was slower than Amy and kept having falls, but not as much as Claw's tower. When both teams had around nine crates stacked, Cameron decided to jump to the skull for his second go and Amie for her third go. Amie jumped first and missed again, then Cameron jumped carefully and caught the skull thus, Sting had won the challenge and gained Ollie. After the challenge, just as everyone left, a cage fell down on Lizzie and Amy and they were trapped. Back at Claw's camp, the other members worried what happened to the girls and thought that maybe they went to Sting or Limbo.

In the Survival Challenge, all three captives successfully ate the ants. Alex T ate lots of them as he liked the ants' taste. He even picked up a whole leaf of them and ate ants off it. Livvi only ate one but didn't like it and she felt nauseous seeing them. Ollie ate a few and he even had a fight with one of them biting in his mouth, while all of them experienced some ant bites. Alex T hoped they would still be there the next day.

At the Island Fire, JK and Joel told Claw a message from the island. The island had captured Lizzie and Amy as a punishment for losing the challenge, and they were held prisoner in Limbo. The good news was that they could be won back in the next challenge.

Day 12 (Episode 23 and 24) 
 Rollin' Thunder - A ship called the Shattered Skull has sailed in. The teams must hold on to a giant spindle above shark invested waters and hang onto it as long as possible. The team that stays on the spindle the longest wins. In Ultimate Jeopardy, the spindle is covered in slime and opposing members can throw skull sponges to try to make them fall off.
 Limbo Challenge - Alex T for White Team vs. Lizzie for Blue Team.
 Ultimate Jeopardy - Olivia and Lachlan from Sting vs Tara and Sammy from Claw.
 Reward - Amy and Lizzie for the winning team and Alex T and Livvi for the losing team.

Lizzie and Amy were gutted that they were in Limbo again, but hoped that they could get back on to Claw soon. The rest of Claw were not acting like normal. Jake decided that he needed to encourage the team more.

At the Stone of Selection, all the captives were selected with Alex T and Livvi on one team and Lizzy and Amie on the other. It was discovered that all of them were going to be leaving Limbo today, with the winners of Ultimate Jeopardy getting the players who won the Limbo Challenge, and the losing team would get the players that lost the Limbo Challenge. Livvi's leg had not been well and if she wasn't able to play, then it would be a 1 vs 1 challenge.

In the Limbo Challenge, since Livvi had a leg injury, Alex T had to do two rounds of Rollin' Thunder. As a result, this meant that only Amie or Lizzy must compete against Alex T for fairness. Amie chose Lizzy to take part in the challenge. Unfortunately, Alex T lasted for 45 seconds long and Lizzy lasted 5 minutes 49 seconds for their first go. Alex T lasted for around one minute, meaning that Lizzy and Amie were clear winners. Lizzy decided to have a second turn, to beat her personal record. She managed an incredible 8 minutes 56 seconds before calmly getting off. She'd even let go of the spindle at some points to trick them.

In Ultimate Jeopardy, Lachlan from Sting lasted 1 second on the spindle and Livvi and Alex started laughing at him. Tara from Claw lasted for 10 seconds. Olivia from Sting however, managed to stay on for 4 minutes and 10 seconds, while Claw had used up all their skulls to throw. She even got a skull hit on her head. Sammy from Claw however, only stayed on for 4 seconds, because of her height not big enough to hang on to the spindle. As a result, Sting won and gained Lizzie and Amy, while Claw not only gained Alex T and Livvi, but also gained two new power plays, "Freeze" and "Head Start".

At the end of the day, there was no one left in Limbo, therefore the camp, the Survival Challenge and the Stone of Selection no longer exist. At the Island Fire, J.K and Joel told the teams that they had two chances to win members of their opposing team.

Day 13 (Episode 25 and 26) 
 The Crush Rush - In the first round, the teams must run down a jungle track with a giant boulder chasing them. The players have to swing on a rope, crawl under a net and run through a muddy pond in the course. The team that runs the whole course in the quickest time or gets the furthest distance before the boulder touches them, wins. In Ultimate Jeopardy, the teams have to run in pairs while carrying a totem pole during the course.
 First Round - Amy and Anna from Sting vs Sammy and Jake from Claw
 Reward: - The choice of a member to win from the opposing team.
 Second Round -  Olivia and Lizzy from Sting vs Tara and Ayla from Claw
 Reward: - Olivia if Claw win or Olivia won back to Sting if they win.

Before the challenge, Livvi decided to use her power play, "Head Start". However, since Livvi sustained a leg injury, Sammy would be the one with the power play, but Livvi had control when to use it, which is why Livvi nominated Sammy to play.

In the first round, Amy went first for Sting. Amie was going well until she got her shirt stuck in the net, slowing her down. Luckily, she was not flatten by the boulder, despite falling over twice. Sammy from Claw went next, who had her Power Play which made her start six seconds before the boulder started to roll. Sammy made a big distance so that the boulder would not be close. It turns out though, that she was slower than Amy at the first six seconds. Next was Anna's turn for Sting. Anna ran very fast, and ploughed her head through the net before finishing. Last was Jake for Claw. Jake went very fast, and even though he got stuck in the net, he didn't run out of breath and finished with a time of 31 seconds. The final results were Amie on 4th place, Sammy and Anna tied 2nd place and Jake in 1st place, meaning that Claw won the round, and had a choice from one of the ten players from Sting to play for.

Claw decided to steal Olivia, who would be their prize if they win Ultimate Jeopardy. The first team to start in Ultimate Jeopardy was Claw with Tara and Ayla. They ran until they got to the scramble net and the boulder hit them. Next was Olivia and Lizzie for Sting. Sting also got to the scramble net and were hit. On Claw's second go, Tara and Ayla were very close to the boulder and at one point, it hit Tara's rear. She and Ayla didn't know this and they ran straight on to the end. In Sting's second run, Olivia had let go of the totem pole at one point leaving Lizzie carrying it by herself until they got to the scramble net, they also made it to the end.

It turned out that Claw was disqualified for not stopping when the boulder hit Tara, and Sting was disqualified when Lizzie and Olivia were both not holding on to the totem pole, which made the results determined by their first run. The winners were Sting, because they were further in the scramble net than Claw, so Sting kept Olivia and the team celebrated back at camp.

Day 14 (Episode 27 and 28) 
 Vertigo - In the first round, the teams must climb up very long ladders and undo six flags. After the team undoes a flag they must climb down to the bottom and climb up again to the next flag. Once all flags have been undone, the team must try to hit a team skull at the top with a baseball bat. The first team to hit the skull wins. In Ultimate Jeopardy, the ladder is 9 metres long and three members will support the ladder.
 Limbo Challenge - Cameron, Cai and Oliver from Sting vs Alex T, Jake and Tara from Claw
 Reward: - The choice of a member to win from the opposing team.
 Ultimate Jeopardy - Alex Y, Amy, Lachlan and Lizzie from Sting vs Alex T, Ayla, Livvi and Sammy from Claw.
 Reward: - Jake if Sting win or Jake won back to Claw if they win.

At the Island Fire the previous night, Alex T from Claw used his Power Play, Freeze for Vertigo.

In the first round, both teams were having trouble getting their ladder upright. Cai was the climber for Sting and Jake was Claw's climber. Jake was the first person to undo a flag, but Cai shortly caught up, while Claw were having problems of their own. Later on, Sting had pulled down their fourth flag, Alex T shouted Freeze, and Sting stopped for twenty seconds, while Claw caught up, though Jake was a little slow from going now the ladder. Soon later, Sting had untied all their flags and were getting ready to hit their skull and Claw were almost about to do the same. Jake and Cai were both swinging everywhere on the top of the ladders while the other team members tried to keep their climber still. Just as Claw was close to hitting their skull, Jake fell off the ladder, and there wasn't enough time for him to get back up as Cai managed to hit the team skull meaning Sting had won the first round, and they had a choice of one of Claw's six members. Meanwhile, the other members of Claw were watching and thought that Jake's last fall looked as if he did it on purpose and they thought he was going up the ladder rather slowly.

At Sting's camp, while the team were packing up their luggage for going back home, Alex Y and Lachlan were both arguing over who owned a piece of rope. Olivia decided to settle this and made them do tug-of-war over the rope. The boys were pulling the rope until Lachlan decided to let go, which made Alex Y fall over and win. Lachlan didn't really care anymore because it was only a piece of rope.

After some members of Claw noticed Jake's movements in the first round of Vertigo thinking he was losing on purpose, Olivia noted that Jake did say to some members of her team that he originally wanted to be in Sting. Jake truthfully denied that he was losing on purpose, and said that the challenge was really hard and he was not good with heights. Both teams did not realise this.

After winning the first round, Sting chose Jake to steal from Claw. Before Ultimate Jeopardy, because Claw had six members and there needed to be four players in the challenge, Ayla, Livvi and Sammy had to take part, and captain Alex T was forced to do the challenge again. Sting's captain Cameron on the other hand chose Alex Y, Amy, Lachlan and Lizzie.

In Ultimate Jeopardy, Alex Y was the climber for Sting while Sammy was the climber for Claw. Neither of the teams ladders fell over and the climbers didn't fall off. Both teams were almost neck and neck, but Sammy was much faster, ripping off the flags as she went, while Alex Y was a little slower. Soon, Sammy had got rid of Claw's flags and was ready to hit the team skull. Alex Y was also ready to hit Sting's skull shortly after. Despite having slight wobbles, Sammy got up to the top of the ladder and hit the team skull, meaning Claw had won the challenge, and successfully defending Jake.

Back at camps, Sting discussed that they needed to have a lot of rest before the final challenge. Claw on the other hand, thought that their team had a slight advantage of escaping Scorpion Island because they would be able to communicate more than Sting with their small number of players, as well as thinking Sting did not work well together.

At the Island Fire, J.K. and Joel told the teams that there were no more chances to steal players, and that the final teams were locked in. The final captains were voted by the teams themselves. Olivia was the captain for Sting and Sammy was the captain for Claw.

Day 15 (Episodes 29 and 30) 
 Torrent of Terror - The teams must pull ropes attached to heavy objects to the top of a mud hill while floods of ice-cold water and large rocks get in their way. The team that gets all the ropes to the top of the hill gets a time advantage. The teams must then pull all of the heavy objects to the top of the hill with the ropes. The teams must then go to the beach and use the heavy objects to build rafts using diagrams before paddling out to a pontoon 100 meters away and hitting a detonator. The team that hits the detonator first wins.
 Challenge - Alex Y, Olivia, Cameron, Anna, Lachlan, Cai, Jack, Oliver, Lizzie and Amy from Sting vs Sammy, Tara, Jake, Ayla, Livvi and Alex T from Claw
 Reward - Escape from Scorpion Island.

Because of her leg injury, Livvi from Claw would not be able to take part in the first round of Torrent of Terror, so one rope was removed from the eight ropes Claw had to move up.

In the first round, both teams were fighting against the water being splashed at them as they pulled their ropes up. Claw had the first rope up to the top, and Sting's Lachlan and Alex Y helped each other bringing Sting's first rope, before a flood came sliding them down. Tara from Claw found an easier way to pull the ropes up, going by the side of the mountain avoiding the floods for her team. Claw was leading but Sting was not far behind. Both teams had massive tumbles sliding down the mountain to pull their next ropes. Soon, some large rocks came rolling towards the teams. A rock smacked straight into Jack's face from Sting. Everyone was very tired but kept moving. When both teams had five ropes up the hill, a massive flood came and pushed some of Sting's members into a huge pile. Claw took the lead again and with their strength, pulled their 7th rope to the top making them win the first round. Sting kept on going, because Claw had got a time advantage the longer Sting took to finish, and used Claw's method of going up the side of the hill. Sting finally got all their eight ropes to the top of the hill, with Claw getting a 59-second advantage from them for the next round.

In the next phase of the challenge, the teams were hauling the ropes to pull their raft equipment up the hill. Both teams were working on a pulling rhythm, but with Sting's larger numbers, they were much faster than Claw and got their raft equipment up first. Sting also managed to decrease the time advantage to 31 seconds.

In the last stage, Claw tried to make the most of the time advantage as they assembled their raft, but there was no communication. Sting were then able to start. They ended up having arguments with each other as captain Olivia was shouting the orders, partially at Lizzie. Claw soon started work on their sail with Sting shortly following. Then, both teams had finished their rafts at the same time, but with wind approaching, they were forced to take down their masts. The teams were almost neck and neck, but with Claw's chanting and paddling, they were slightly ahead, while Sting had no communication, and no one was paddling in time. Claw kept working together, until they got to the pontoon with captain Sammy pushing the detonator claiming victory. Team Claw had escaped from Scorpion Island.

A luxurious boat then came to take Claw home. Sting went back to the beach and watched in disappointment. They said they didn't have good teamwork and were disappointed with themselves. Meanwhile, as the boat was taking Claw home, they were giving the chance to phone their parents.

Facts 
 Jake, Sammy, Olivia and Oliver were the favourites by the judges.
 In the first episode, Sammy, Jake and Tara are introduced as Team Sting and Alex, Olivia and Cameron as Team Claw. However, this was a mistake as at all times except this, Sammy, Jake and Tara were in Team Claw and Alex Y, Olivia and Cameron were in Team Sting.
 Sammy and Olivia were both the first and last captains of the teams.
 This was the only series in which the entire composition of the teams was not random and where Sting and Claw had been started. This was necessary to allow teams to win players.
 Every time that Cai played the Limbo Challenge, he was in the winning team and was nominated to be released from Limbo. He was first nominated twice by Claw (One False Move and Fearfall), in Above and Beyond he was won by Sting
 Anna, Ayla and Lachlan escaped from Limbo in their first attempt.
 Anna had the shortest time in Limbo with only two days while Alex T and Livvy spent the most time in Limbo with twelve days. 
 Alex Y is the only original adventurer to have been in Limbo. 
 Lachlan is the only Power Player to be a member of Sting.  
 In the Crush Rush, it is revealed that Olivia is "Mama Sting".
 In many scenes, especially the first episode, spoilers were shown around such as which members were going to be on Sting or Claw, parts of the challenge and even the winning team was shown.
 In one scene in the first episode, a group hug was done. This scene was shown only once and not seen since. The people who were involved in this group hug were members from both Sting and Claw. Cai, Cameron, Ayla, Anna, Jake, Ollie, Lizzie, Amy, Lachlan, Sammy and Tara can be seen.
 Jack from Sting expressed his early desire to join Claw but was evenly happy to join Sting.
 Jake from Claw was said to be a traitor on his team but he denied this strongly that he really was having a hard time with the challenge because he was scared of heights. Some of his team players did not realize this.
 The third Survival Challenge is the first Survival Challenge that the Limbo Captives had received a Forfeit in.
 Three challenges in this series were similar to challenges in Series 1. Pedal of Peril is similar to Bike Lane, Fearfall is like Colourfall and Torrent of Terror is like Landslide.
 On screens, Livvy is shown as "Livvy". However, her helmet says "Livvi". It is unknown if it is a typo despite her actual name is Olivia.
 On screens, Oliver is shown as "Oliver". However, his helmet says "Ollie" and when selected as captain at the Island Fire, it too said "Ollie". This is because his nickname is Ollie.
 In the Stone of Selection for The Last Gasp, Ollie was marked for the blue team and Alex T was marked for the white team. In the challenge, their colours were swapped.
 At the Stone of Selection for Tower of Strength, Ollie was marked white and since Alex T was taking the place of Livvy, he should've been blue but in the challenge, it was swapped again like The Last Gasp.
 Every time a Power Player used their Power, their team won, except Alex T who used Freeze in Vertigo but despite this Claw lost that challenge.
 Both teams had the most players at one stage.
 In the challenge, The Crush Rush, Lizzy from Sting, who was in Claw beforehand, was wearing a black helmet for reasons unknown even though she wore an orange helmet (being the correct one for Sting) in Vertigo and Torrent of Terror. 
 Because of her leg injury, Livvy is the only adventurer to not wear a wetsuit in Torrent of Terror. 
 Lizzie and Amie, who Sting stole from Claw after winning the challenge Rollin Thunder, wear both the Claw and Sting necklaces at the same time.
 Lizzie expressed her desire to go to Claw again after being captivated by the island but it wasn't able to be granted. She then tells us that her heart is still in Claw.
 In Sting's inauguration of Amie and Lizzy, Amie's eyes can be seen watering as if she still wants to be in Claw or maybe because she let her former team down in Tower of Strength. She felt very sad but got through it in the end.
 Jack is the only member not to become captain for any challenge.
 Amie is the only member to become a captain on both Claw and Sting.
 Even though Sting had more members, Claw had the most Power Players.
 Having the fewest players to win would have made the raft lighter and easier to manage for team claw. However, Sting having more people on their raft would have a lot more power. But it was due to Claw's teamwork and Sting's lack of teamwork and not the number of players that caused Claw to win.
 At the beginning of Rollin Thunder, it revealed that Livvy's injury was a 13 cm splinter stuck in her leg. This was caused while not filming, presumably between Stretched to the Limit and Reckless Rally.
 Whenever Anna was captain of Sting, she always chose Cameron and her team loses the challenge.
 The first rounds for The Crush Rush, Vertigo and Torrent of Terror are the only challenges for Sting and Claw to take part in instead of Limbo Captives.
 Decks of Doom, The Last Gasp, Reckless Rally and The Crush Rush were also reused and slightly modified in Series 3 being named Triple Decker, Collision Course, Wheelspin and The Boulderizer respectively.
 Before Jack had joined Sting, he had played in every challenge except for Above and Beyond and The Last Gasp
 When Oliver was in Limbo, he participated in every Limbo Challenge except for Decks of Doom.
 Jake was the sole male on Claw until day 7 when Claw won Oliver. On day 9, when Oliver went back to Limbo, Jake became the sole male again until day 12 when Claw won Alex T.
 Alex T is the only male Limbo captive to have escaped. 
 This marks the only time that a team with more than 5 members have escaped; in Claw's case 6. 
 The Limbo captives only received a forfeit 3 times during the Survival Challenges.
 In Series 3, the Limbo Challenge and Ultimate Jeopardy became The Eliminator and Double Jeopardy, respectively.
 Alex T has only been stung blue once at the Stone of Selection.
 Only the female adventurers from Australia (Tara and Ayla) have escaped.

References

External links 
 

2008 British television seasons
2009 British television seasons

pl:Ucieczka z Wyspy Skorpiona